In number theory, Zsigmondy's theorem, named after Karl Zsigmondy, states that if  are coprime integers, then for any integer , there is a prime number p (called a primitive prime divisor) that divides  and does not divide  for any positive integer , with the following exceptions:

, ; then  which has no prime divisors

Similarly,  has at least one primitive prime divisor with the exception .

Zsigmondy's theorem is often useful, especially in group theory, where it is used to prove that various groups have distinct orders except when they are known to be the same.

History
The theorem was discovered by Zsigmondy working in Vienna from 1894 until 1925.

Generalizations 
Let  be a sequence of nonzero integers.
The Zsigmondy set associated to the sequence is the set

In 2001 Bilu, Hanrot, and Voutier
proved that in general, if  is a Lucas sequence or a Lehmer sequence, then  (see , there are only 13 such s, namely 1, 2, 3, 4, 5, 6, 7, 8, 10, 12, 13, 18, 30).
Lucas and Lehmer sequences are examples of divisibility sequences.

It is also known that if  is an elliptic divisibility sequence, then its Zsigmondy
set  is finite.

See also
 Carmichael's theorem

References

External links 

Theorems in number theory